The Futop language, Efutop (Ofutop), is an Ekoid language of Nigeria. The E- in Efutop represents the class prefix for "language", analogous to the Bantu ki- in KiSwahili.

One of a number of similar but distinct languages spoken in the Cross River region, its area includes the town of Abaragba as well as Ekpokpa, Mkpura, Ndim, Okanga-Nkpansi, Okanga-Njimowan, and Okosura. The vocabulary for David W. Crabb's item in Ekoid Bantu Languages of Ogoja was from Mr. Anthony A. Eyam of Abaragba.

Phonology

Tone 
Significant tone is important in this language.

Vocabulary 
Some vocabulary (in a simplified orthography, without tone markings):

 nhnham - animal (low tone-low tone) nh is palatal
 nggurɛgbɛ - antelope (low-low-low-low) ng is syllabic
 obuɔ - arm, hand 
 ngkuɔn - bee
 mmuɔn - child
 ofuu - day (low-high)
 nim - do (low)
 yum - dry (high tone)
 yinə - forget (high-low).

References

External links
Efutop basic lexicon at the Global Lexicostatistical Database

Ekoid languages
Languages of Nigeria